Philippe Bélaval (born 21 August 1955) is a French high-ranking official.

He has been president of the Centre des monuments nationaux since 2012.

Life 
Born in Toulouse, Belaval graduated from the Institut d'études politiques de Toulouse (class 1975). He is a former student of the École nationale d'administration, and was an auditor of the 58th national session of the Institut des hautes études de défense nationale. He has been a member of the Conseil d'État since 1979.

Honours 
  Officier de la Légion d'honneur
  Chevalier de la Légion d'honneur decree dated 24 March 1998
  Commandeur de l'ordre national du Mérite
 Officier de l'ordre national du Mérite decree dated 11 March 2002
  Commandeur de l'ordre des Arts et des Lettres

References

External links 
 Philippe Belaval on Biographies.com
 Biography on the site of the Archives de France

École nationale d'administration alumni
Officiers of the Légion d'honneur
Commanders of the Ordre national du Mérite
Commandeurs of the Ordre des Arts et des Lettres
1955 births
Living people
People from Toulouse
Directors of the Paris Opera